2MYX (an abbreviation of To My Ex) is the debut mini album from the South Korean boy band A-Jax. It was released in November 15, 2012 with the song of same name used as the promotional track. The EP also includes the singles "One 4 U" and "Hot Game".

Background
On November 15, the EP and music video of "2MYX" were released at the same time. "2MYX" was described as a response to the Girls' Generation's song "Run Devil Run".

Composition
The EP is composed of seven songs: three new songs, three already-released songs, and an instrumental. "2MYX" was written by Cha Yong-un and Yi Sin-seong and composed by John Lundvik, Andreas Oberg and Kalle Engstrom. "Catch Me If You Can" was written by Koh Minae and composed by Steven Lee and Jimmy Richard Drew. Steven Lee also produced the songs "Your Song", "One 4 U", and "Never Let Go" and composed "Hot Game", which was written by Kim Ji-hyang. An instrumental of "2MYX" was also included on the EP.

Promotion
Promotions for the EP and "2MYX" started on November 15, on Mnet's show M! Countdown. The group also promoted on the music shows Music Bank, Music Core, Inkigayo and Show Champion.

Track listing

Charts

Album chart

Singles chart

Release history

References

External links
 

2012 debut EPs
Korean-language EPs
Dance-pop EPs